Swift Aircraft is a British aerospace manufacturer that designs the Swift II aerobatic training aircraft.

Swift II
The Swift II is a side-by-side, twin-seat training and aerobatic aircraft, and is currently in the final stages of design. Swift Aircraft plan to market the Swift II for the military and civilian markets when it becomes available. The aircraft will be of all composite construction to save weight and improve performance. The company expects to commence tooling for construction of the Swift II by the end of 2011 and will initially offer the Swift II as a kit, before bringing the design up to certified standard. The Swift range is planned to include:
Swift II (Certified CS-23)
Swift VLA (Certified CS-VLA)
Swift VLA (kit plane)

Other Activities
The company also sells and leases the Slingsby Firefly, having purchased 22 examples from Babcock Defense Services in June 2011. It is responsible for support and service of the Firefly, although it does not possess the Type certificate as this was revoked by Marshall Group.

In June 2019, permission Has been granted from local councils to reopen the runway at RAF Coltishall and allow Swift Aircraft to produce 98 aircraft a year as well as allowing 8 flights a day from the airfield.

References

External links
Swift Aircraft website

Aircraft manufacturers of the United Kingdom